Santa Comba Dão is a city and a municipality in the Viseu District in Portugal. The population in 2011 was 11,597, in an area of 111.95 km2. The city proper has a population of 3,300.

The present mayor is Leonel Gouveia, elected in 2013 by Socialist Party. The municipal holiday is Ascension Day.

António de Oliveira Salazar, the leader of Portugal from 1932 to 1968 and founder of the Estado Novo, was born in Vimieiro, Santa Comba Dão on 28 April 1889 to a rural family of modest income.

The town's station was formerly a terminus of the Dão line to/from Viseu. This narrow gauge railway opened in 1890 and was closed to passengers in 1988.

Santa Comba Dão was granted city status in 1999. In mid-2000s, a serial killer murdered three young women in the municipality.

Parishes

Administratively, the municipality is divided into 6 civil parishes (freguesias):
 Ovoa e Vimieiro
 Pinheiro de Ázere
 Santa Comba Dão e Couto do Mosteiro
 São Joaninho
 São João de Areias
 Treixedo e Nagozela

Notable people 
 José Maria de Sousa Macedo Almeida e Vasconcelos, 1st Baron of Santa Comba Dão (1787-1872), nobleman, military leader and politician
 José Maria de Sousa Horta e Costa (1858–1927), soldier, politician, diplomat and colonial Governor of Macau 1894-97 & 1900-02 and 113th Governor-General of India 1907-10
 António de Oliveira Salazar (1889 in Vimieiro – 1970), statesman and economist, leader of Portugal as Chairman of the Council of Ministers from 1932 to 1968. He was responsible for the Estado Novo  ("New State")
 João Coimbra (born 1986), former footballer with 296 club appearances

References

External links

Municipality official website
Treixedo website
Photos from Santa Comba Dão

Towns in Portugal
Populated places in Viseu District
Municipalities of Viseu District
People from Santa Comba Dão